In probability theory, the Kelly criterion (or Kelly strategy or Kelly bet), is a formula that determines the optimal theoretical size for a bet. It is valid when the expected returns are known.  The Kelly bet size is found by maximizing the expected value of the logarithm of wealth, which is equivalent to maximizing the expected geometric growth rate. J. L. Kelly Jr, a researcher at Bell Labs, described the criterion in 1956. Because the Kelly Criterion leads to higher wealth than any other strategy in the long run (i.e., the theoretical maximum return as the number of bets goes to infinity), it is a scientific gambling method.

The practical use of the formula has been demonstrated for gambling and the same idea was used to explain diversification in investment management. In the 2000s, Kelly-style analysis became a part of mainstream investment theory and the claim has been made that well-known successful investors including Warren Buffett and Bill Gross use Kelly methods.  Also see Intertemporal portfolio choice.

Optimal betting example 
In a study, each participant was given $25 and asked to place even-money bets on a coin that would land heads 60% of the time. Participants had 30 minutes to play, so could place about 300 bets, and the prizes were capped at $250.  But the behavior of the test subjects was far from optimal:

Using the Kelly criterion and based on the odds in the experiment (ignoring the cap of $250 and the finite duration of the test), the right approach would be to bet 20% of one's bankroll on each toss of the coin, which works out to a 2.034% average gain each round. This is a geometric mean, not the arithmetic rate of 4%.  The theoretical expected wealth after 300 rounds works out to $10,505 if it were not capped. 

In this particular game, because of the cap, a strategy of betting only 12% of the pot on each toss would have even better results (a 95% probability of reaching the cap and an average payout of $242.03).

Gambling formula 
Where losing the bet involves losing the entire wager, the Kelly bet is:

where:
  is the fraction of the current bankroll to wager.
  is the probability of a win.
  is the probability of a loss.
  is the proportion of the bet gained with a win.  E.g. If betting $10 on a 2-to-1 odds bet, (upon win you are returned $30, winning you $20), then .
As an example, if a gamble has a 60% chance of winning, and the gambler receives 1-to-1 odds on a winning bet, then to maximize the long-run growth rate of the bankroll, the gambler should bet 20% of the bankroll at each opportunity.

 If the gambler has zero edge, i.e. if , then the criterion recommends for the gambler to bet nothing.

If the edge is negative the formula gives a negative result, indicating that the gambler should take the other side of the bet. For example, in American roulette, the bettor is offered an even money payoff on red, when there are 18 red numbers and 20 non-red numbers on the wheel. There is no explicit anti-red bet offered with comparable odds in roulette, so the best a Kelly gambler can do is bet nothing.

Investment formula 
A more general form of the Kelly formula allows for partial losses, which is relevant for investments:
 
where:
  is the fraction of the assets to apply to the security.
  is the probability that the investment increases in value.
  is the probability that the investment decreases in value.
  is the fraction that is lost in a negative outcome.  If the security price falls 10%, then 
  is the fraction that is gained in a positive outcome.  If the security price rises 10%, then .
Note that the Kelly Criterion is valid only for known outcome probabilities, which is not the case with investments. Risk averse investors should not invest the full Kelly fraction.

This formula can result in Kelly fractions higher than 1. In this case, it is theoretically advantageous to use leverage to purchase additional securities on margin.

Proof 
Heuristic proofs of the Kelly criterion are straightforward. The Kelly criterion maximizes the expected value of the logarithm of wealth (the expectation value of a function is given by the sum, over all possible outcomes, of the probability of each particular outcome multiplied by the value of the function in the event of that outcome). Therefore, the expected geometric growth rate  is:
 
We want to find the maximum r of this curve (as a function of f), which involves finding the derivative of the equation. This is more easily accomplished by taking the logarithm of each side first. The resulting equation is:
 
with  denoting logarithmic wealth growth. This gives:
 
Rearranging this equation to solve for the value of  gives the Kelly criterion:
 
Notice that this expression reduces to the simple gambling formula when , when a loss results in full loss of the wager.

Bernoulli 

In a 1738 article, Daniel Bernoulli suggested that, when one has a choice of bets or investments, one should choose that with the highest geometric mean of outcomes. This is mathematically equivalent to the Kelly criterion, although the motivation is different (Bernoulli wanted to resolve the St. Petersburg paradox).

An English-language translation of the Bernoulli article was not published until 1954, but the work was well known among mathematicians and economists.

Application to the stock market 

In mathematical finance, if security weights maximize the expected geometric growth rate (which is equivalent to maximizing log wealth), then a portfolio is growth optimal. 

Computations of growth optimal portfolios can suffer tremendous garbage in, garbage out problems. For example, the cases below take as given the expected return and covariance structure of assets, but these parameters are at best estimates or models that have significant uncertainty. If portfolio weights are largely a function of estimation errors, then Ex-post performance of a growth-optimal portfolio may differ fantastically from the ex-ante prediction. Parameter uncertainty and estimation errors are a large topic in portfolio theory. An approach to counteract the unknown risk is to invest less than the Kelly criterion (e.g., half).

Criticism 
Although the Kelly strategy's promise of doing better than any other strategy in the long run seems compelling, some economists have argued strenuously against it, mainly because an individual's specific investing constraints may override the desire for optimal growth rate. The conventional alternative is expected utility theory which says bets should be sized to maximize the expected utility of the outcome (to an individual with logarithmic utility, the Kelly bet maximizes expected utility, so there is no conflict; moreover, Kelly's original paper clearly states the need for a utility function in the case of gambling games which are played finitely many times). Even Kelly supporters usually argue for fractional Kelly (betting a fixed fraction of the amount recommended by Kelly) for a variety of practical reasons, such as wishing to reduce volatility, or protecting against non-deterministic errors in their advantage (edge) calculations.

Advanced mathematics 
For a rigorous and general proof, see Kelly's original paper or some of the other references listed below. Some corrections have been published.
When , a Kelly bettor bets  times their initial wealth , as shown above. If they win, they have  after one bet. If they lose, they have . Suppose they make  bets like this, and win  times out of this series of  bets. The resulting wealth will be:
 
Note that the ordering of the wins and losses does not affect the resulting wealth. They will have  after a win and  after a loss. After the same series of wins and losses as the Kelly bettor, they will have:
 
 
The function is maximized when this derivative is equal to zero, which occurs at:
 
which implies that
 
but the proportion of winning bets will eventually converge to:
 
according to the weak law of large numbers.
So in the long run, final wealth is maximized by setting  to zero, which means following the Kelly strategy.
This illustrates that Kelly has both a deterministic and a stochastic component. If one knows K and N and wishes to pick a constant fraction of wealth to bet each time (otherwise one could cheat and, for example, bet zero after the Kth win knowing that the rest of the bets will lose), one will end up with the most money if one bets:
 
each time. This is true whether  is small or large. The "long run" part of Kelly is necessary because K is not known in advance, just that as  gets large,  will approach . Someone who bets more than Kelly can do better if  for a stretch; someone who bets less than Kelly can do better if  for a stretch, but in the long run, Kelly always wins.
The heuristic proof for the general case proceeds as follows.
In a single trial, if you invest the fraction  of your capital, if your strategy succeeds, your capital at the end of the trial increases by the factor , and, likewise, if the strategy fails, you end up having your capital decreased by the factor . Thus at the end of  trials (with  successes and  failures), the starting capital of $1 yields
 
Maximizing , and consequently , with respect to  leads to the desired result
 
Edward O. Thorp provided a more detailed discussion of this formula for the general case. In practice, this is a matter of playing the same game over and over, where the probability of winning and the payoff odds are always the same. In the heuristic proof above,  successes and  failures are highly likely only for very large .

Multiple outcomes 
Kelly's criterion may be generalized on gambling on many mutually exclusive outcomes, such as in horse races. Suppose there are several mutually exclusive outcomes.

where  are the pay-off odds. , is the dividend rate where  is the track take or tax,  is the revenue rate after deduction of the track take when -th horse wins. Kelly's criterion for gambling with multiple mutually exclusive outcomes gives an algorithm for finding the optimal set  of outcomes on which it is reasonable to bet and it gives explicit formula for finding the optimal fractions  of bettor's wealth to be bet on the outcomes included in the optimal set .
The algorithm for the optimal set of outcomes consists of four steps:
 Calculate the expected revenue rate for all possible (or only for several of the most promising) outcomes: 
 Reorder the outcomes so that the new sequence  is non-increasing.  Thus  will be the best bet.
 Set  (the empty set), .  Thus the best bet  will be considered first.
 Repeat:
If  then insert -th outcome into the set: , recalculate  according to the formula:   and then set ,  Otherwise, set  and stop the repetition.

If the optimal set  is empty then do not bet at all. If the set  of optimal outcomes is not empty, then the optimal fraction  to bet on -th outcome may be calculated from this formula:
 

One may prove that

where the right hand-side is the reserve rate. Therefore, the requirement  may be interpreted as follows: -th outcome is included in the set  of optimal outcomes if and only if its expected revenue rate is greater than the reserve rate. The formula for the optimal fraction  may be interpreted as the excess of the expected revenue rate of -th horse over the reserve rate divided by the revenue after deduction of the track take when -th horse wins or as the excess of the probability of -th horse winning over the reserve rate divided by revenue after deduction of the track take when -th horse wins. The binary growth exponent is

and the doubling time is
 

This method of selection of optimal bets may be applied also when probabilities  are known only for several most promising outcomes, while the remaining outcomes have no chance to win. In this case it must be that
  and
 .

Stock investments 
The second-order Taylor polynomial can be used as a good approximation of the main criterion. Primarily, it is useful for stock investment, where the fraction devoted to investment is based on simple characteristics that can be easily estimated from existing historical data – expected value and variance. This approximation leads to results that are robust and offer similar results as the original criterion.

For single assets(stock, index fund, etc.), and a risk-free rate, it is easy to obtain the optimal fraction to invest through geometric Brownian motion.
The value of a lognormally distributed asset  at time  is
 
Taking expectations of the logarithm:

Then the expected log return  is

however people seem to deal with the expected log return  for one-period instead in the context of Kelly:

Solving  we obtain

 is the fraction that maximizes the expected logarithmic return, and so, is the Kelly fraction.
Thorp arrived at the same result but through a different derivation.
Remember that  is different from the asset log return . Confusing this is a common mistake made by websites and articles talking about the Kelly Criterion.

For multiple assets, consider a market with  correlated stocks  with stochastic returns ,  and a riskless bond with return . Without loss of generality, assume that investor's starting capital is equal to 1.
According to the Kelly criterion one should maximize

Expanding this with a Taylor series around  we obtain

Thus we reduce the optimization problem to quadratic programming and the unconstrained solution
is

There is also a numerical algorithm for the fractional Kelly strategies and for the optimal solution under no leverage and no short selling constraints.

See also 
Risk of ruin
Gambling and information theory
Proebsting's paradox
Merton's portfolio problem

References

External links

Optimal decisions
Gambling mathematics
Information theory
Wagering
Articles containing proofs
1956 introductions
Portfolio theories